The Queen Elizabeth Walk is a promenade located at the Esplanade Park within the Downtown Core district of the Central Area of Singapore.

See also
History of Singapore

References
National Heritage Board (2002), Singapore's 100 Historic Places, Archipelago Press, 
Victor R Savage, Brenda S A Yeoh (2004), Toponymics - A Study of Singapore Street Names, Eastern University Press,

External links
Singapore Government eCitizen website

Downtown Core (Singapore)
Landmarks in Singapore